KK Šibenik history and statistics in FIBA Europe and Euroleague Basketball (company) competitions.

European competitions

Record
KK Šibenik has overall, from 1981–82 (first participation) to 1994–95 (last participation): 23 wins against 27 defeats in 50 games for all the European club competitions.

 EuroLeague
 FIBA Saporta Cup
 FIBA Korać Cup: 23–27 (50)

See also 
 Yugoslav basketball clubs in European competitions

External links
FIBA Europe
EuroLeague
ULEB
EuroCup

Sibenik